Paulista is a metro station on Line 4-Yellow of the São Paulo Metro, operated by ViaQuatro, and it's located in the Consolação district. It has free connection with Consolação station of Line 2-Green, operated by São Paulo Metro.

History
The first prediction of conclusion of the construction of the first phase stations, which included Paulista station, was 2008. Paulista station is  under the Line 2-Green tunnel.

The station was initially scheduled to open in March 2010, but was delayed to 25 May 2010, day that the Line started its service, between Paulista and Faria Lima stations. The delay was caused by the train tests. With the start of the fee charge on 21 June 2010, the connection with Consolação station by moving walkway began.

Characteristics
Underground station with side platforms and support rooms above the ground, with structures in apparent concrete and distribution catwalk in metallic structure, fixated with braces above the platform. It has access for people with disabilities and connection with Consolação station, of Line 2-Green.

The  connection between Paulista and Consolação stations has moving walkways, the first of the São Paulo Metro. The capacity of all the walkways are of 20,000 passengers per hour. In 2019, 4 moving walkways were removed by the São Paulo Metro, with the objective to reduce the passage time between both stations. The Metro and ViaQuatro agents, along with the commuters, informally called the crossing between the two stations as the "march of the penguins".

The station has 10 ViaQuatro attendance and maintenance agents and 10 attendance and security agents, beside ambulances.

Station layout

References

Railway stations opened in 2010
São Paulo Metro stations
Railway stations located underground in Brazil